The F Word (also called Gordon Ramsay's F Word) is a British cookery programme featuring chef Gordon Ramsay.  The programme covers a wide range of topics, from recipes to food preparation and celebrity food fads.  The programme was made by Optomen Television and aired weekly on Channel 4.  The theme tune for the series is "The F-Word" from the Babybird album Bugged.

Programme segments
Each episode is based around Ramsay preparing a three-course meal at the F Word restaurant for 50 guests.  Diners in the restaurant include celebrities, who participate in conversations, challenges, and cook-offs with Ramsay. Other segments focus on food-related topics such as alternative foods, visits by Ramsay to help people focus on healthy cooking and eating, and even Ramsay himself demonstrating recipes of the courses to the home viewers.  Finally, there was a series-long feature on home-reared livestock or poultry that was ultimately served to F Word diners on the series finale.

Series 1

The first series is based around the "Get Women Back in the Kitchen" campaign where Ramsay visited several English households to help women who wanted to improve their culinary skills.  The Timess restaurant critic Giles Coren and food writer Rachel Cooke acted as field correspondents who presented reports on unique food fads and healthy eating respectively.  Two or three commis (picked from a thousand applicants) squared off in each episode to earn a position at one of Ramsay's restaurants.  Ramsay raised turkeys in his garden, so that his children gained a better understanding of where their food came from. Chef and television presenter Hugh Fearnley-Whittingstall regularly offered tips on raising free range turkeys. The turkeys were named after other celebrity chefs, for example, Ainsley, Antony, Jamie, Delia, Gary and Nigella.  The pudding (dessert) challenge regularly pitted Ramsay with a celebrity guest, with the winner having the honour of serving his or her pudding to the guests at the F-Word restaurant.

Series 2
The series theme emphasises the importance of Sunday lunch, with Ramsay teaching families how to prepare this meal on a regular basis. From the second series onward, the restaurant had 50 paying diners served by an amateur brigade.  If guests found any of their food unsatisfactory, they could choose not to pay for that item.  Janet Street-Porter became the series' regular field correspondent; Giles Coren only appeared in a one-off segment on the Pimp That Snack web site and phenomenon.  The celebrity pudding challenge was changed to a general cooking challenge, while Ramsay raised pigs in his garden, which he named Trinny and Susannah. Hugh Fearnley-Whittingstall returned to offer advice on raising the pigs.  Unlike Series 1, the second series of the show was usually transmitted after the 9pm watershed, meaning that Ramsay's infamous bad language was no longer bleeped out.

Series 3
This series ran a campaign stating that "Fast food doesn't have to mean junk food", with Ramsay showing people how to prepare a simple supper in under 30 minutes, without having to order takeaways or rely on frozen meals or other convenience food.  The best weekly amateur brigade was rewarded with the prestige of cooking at Ramsay's restaurant at Claridge's in the series finale.  Ramsay home-reared a pair of Charollais-Welsh lambs, named Charlotte and Gavin.  There was also a series-long search for a new "Fanny Cradock" which culminated in the selection of Ravinder Bhogal.

Series 4
This series' weekly amateur brigade featured a celebrity and their relatives. Janet Street-Porter took on the responsibility of rearing veal calves nicknamed Elton and David in a North Yorkshire farm. Food columnist Tom Parker Bowles appeared on two episodes. In his first appearance, he visited Sardinia to sample casu marzu, a local cheese containing maggots. On his second stint, he attempted to cook a whole pig.

Series 5
A fifth series premiered on 3 November 2009 on Channel 4. The series focused on a search for "Britain's best local restaurant". 10,000 nominations were narrowed down to 18 restaurant finalists representing nine different cuisines. The second round involved the finalists serving their signature dishes to a panel of diners at their own establishments, followed by a semi-final cook-off at Ramsay's flagship restaurant at Royal Hospital Road in Chelsea.

U.S. version

On 30 September 2016, Fox announced that  The F Word would go to the United States sometime in 2017. On 3 February 2017, it was announced that it would air for the summer. Each installment of the series will be presented live and will feature surprise guests and VIPs as well as foodie families from across the U.S. battling in cook-offs.

The series premiered on 31 May 2017 on Fox.

Episode guide

Series 1

Series 2

Series 3

Series 4

Series 5

International broadcasters
The show has been broadcast around the world including the following countries:

In South Korea, the show was renamed Cook-King

Controversy and criticism

Women in the kitchen
A major component of series 1 was Ramsay's "Get Women Back in the Kitchen" campaign. In a self-administered survey, he found that three-quarters of women could not cook, with some 78% never cooking a regular evening dinner. Ramsay's findings were met with mixed reactions. While some of his contemporaries, like Nigella Lawson, previously stated similar opinions, other celebrity chefs, like Clarissa Dickson Wright, felt Ramsay's proposition was "rubbish and about ten years out of date". Wright felt that these comments undermined the increased enrollment of women at culinary schools across the United Kingdom. It was claimed that his desire was to help women who want to be able to cook but lack the confidence or motivation.

Animal slaughter
The second-to-last episode of the first series featured the slaughter of six turkeys that were raised in Ramsay's garden. The scene had been preceded with a content warning. 27 viewers complained about the slaughter, leading to an investigation by Ofcom. Conversely, the media watchdog and Channel 4 also received 18 letters of support to counter the complaints. In 2004, Ramsay had also been criticised by the broadcast watchdog for swearing on-air.
In the second series, viewers also saw the slaughter of his two pigs, which were raised throughout the series. They were taken to an abattoir and their brains stunned with an electric shock before being slaughtered. A few months earlier, another Channel 4 series, Jamie's Great Italian Escape (featuring Jamie Oliver) also received similar complaints after it featured the slaughter of a lamb.
Similarly the lambs he kept were slaughtered at the end of series three. Warnings were given to viewers before the start of the programme explaining the graphic nature of the footage, there was no censoring of the death or evisceration of the animal.
In series four, Ramsay received criticism for "sky fishing" for puffins, having their necks broken and eating the animals' raw flesh and heart of two birds, a local tradition in Iceland. Ofcom received 42 complaints, but no rules were deemed broken. Ofcom "also noted the birds were killed in a humane way with minimal suffering".

DVD releases

North America

BFS Entertainment has released all five series of The F Word on DVD in Region 1.

United Kingdom

IMC Vision has released the first four series of The F Word on DVD in Region 2.

References

External links
 
 The Daily Record: "How do you eat a plate of gannet?  A. Er, like a gannet."
 Macleans.ca: "You go, Gordon Ramsay"
 BBC - "Complaints as Ramsay kills turkey"
 

2005 British television series debuts
2010 British television series endings
Channel 4 original programming
British cooking television shows
English-language television shows
Television series by All3Media
Food and drink magazines